Charles Elmer Miller (January 4, 1892 – April 23, 1972) was an American Major League Baseball shortstop who played for the St. Louis Browns in . He is the only player in the history of 
MLB to have been caught stealing twice in their only game.

External links
Baseball Reference.com
Retrosheet
Baseball Reference – most times caught stealing in only MLB game

1892 births
1972 deaths
St. Louis Browns players
Baseball players from Missouri